Graphium liponesco, the long-tailed striped swordtail, is a butterfly in the family Papilionidae. It is found in Guinea, Sierra Leone, Ivory Coast, Ghana, Togo and western Nigeria. Its habitat consists of wet and moist forests in good condition. It is very similar to Graphium policenoides and  Graphium policenes

Taxonomy
It is a member of the Graphium policenes-clade (policenes, Graphium liponesco, Graphium biokoensis, Graphium policenoides, Graphium porthaon.)

References

External links
External images

liponesco
Butterflies of Africa
Butterflies described in 1904